Sgarro alla camorra (i.e. "Offence to the Camorra") is a 1973 Italian musical-crime film written and directed  by Ettore Maria Fizzarotti and starring Mario Merola at his film debut. It is regarded as the first sceneggiata film and as a prototype for the genre. It was shot in Cetara, Province of Salerno.

Plot

Cast   

Mario Merola as Andrea Staiano
 Franco Acampora as Pietro Morra
Dada Gallotti as  Angela
Enzo Cannavale as  Vicienzo "Papele"
Pietro De Vico as Gnasso
Dolores Palumbo as Pietro's Mother
Aldo Bufi Landi as Scicco
Giuseppe Anatrelli as  Don Enrico Cecere
Silvia Dionisio as  Gisella Gargiulo
Saro Urzì as The “Great Uncle”
Renzo Pevarello as Don Alfonso

References

External links

     
Italian crime films 
1970s crime films
Films about the Camorra
Films directed by Ettore Maria Fizzarotti
Films set in Campania
1970s Italian films